Hendavaneh-ye Pordesar (also Romanized as Hendavāneh-ye Pordesar; also known as Hendavāneh-ye Desar) is a village in Kenar Sar Rural District, Kuchesfahan District, Rasht County, Gilan Province, Iran. At the 2006 census, its population was 572, in 173 families.

References 

Populated places in Rasht County